The John Bexell House, located in Corvallis, Oregon, is a house listed on the National Register of Historic Places.

Architecturally, it is a single-story block with a very steep (16/12) gable roof.  It was designed in 1926 by architects Bennes & Herzog, with John Virginius Bennes believed to have served as principal on the project.

See also
 National Register of Historic Places listings in Benton County, Oregon

References

External links
 

1926 establishments in Oregon
Individually listed contributing properties to historic districts on the National Register in Oregon
Houses in Corvallis, Oregon
Houses completed in 1926
Houses on the National Register of Historic Places in Oregon
National Register of Historic Places in Benton County, Oregon
Tudor Revival architecture in Oregon